Stone City can refer to:

 Stone City, ancient fortified site within the modern city of Nanjing, China
 Stone City, former name of Lost City, California, United States
 Stone City (game), created for the Cold Stone Creamery
 Stone City, historic nickname for Joliet, Illinois, United States
 Stone City, Iowa historic town in Iowa, United States  
Stone City, Iowa (painting), 1930 painting by Grant Wood

See also 
 Stone Town, ancient fortified site in Zanzibar